KRMB (90.1 FM) is a Spanish language Christian radio station licensed to Bisbee, Arizona. KRMB serves the Sierra Vista, Arizona area, and is owned by World Radio Network, Inc.

References

External links
 KRMB website
 

RMB
RMB
Radio stations established in 1997